Inonotus obliquus, commonly called chaga (a Latinisation of the Russian word чага), is a fungus in the family Hymenochaetaceae. It is parasitic on birch and other trees. The sterile conk is irregularly formed and resembles burnt charcoal. It is not the fruiting body of the fungus, but a sclerotium or mass of mycelium, mostly black because of a great amount of melanin. Some people consider chaga medicinal.

Inonotus obliquus is found most commonly in the Circumboreal Region of the Northern Hemisphere, where it is distributed in birch forests.

Common names
The name chaga comes from the Russian name of the fungus, which in turn is borrowed from the word for "mushroom" in Komi, the language of the indigenous peoples in the Kama River Basin, west of the Ural Mountains. It is also known as the clinker polypore, cinder conk, black mass and birch canker polypore. In England and officially in Canada, it is known as the sterile conk trunk rot of birch.

Morphology
Inonotus obliquus causes a white heart rot to develop in the host tree. The chaga spores enter the tree through wounds, particularly poorly healed branch stubs. The white rot decay will spread throughout the heartwood of the host. During the infection cycle, penetration of the sapwood occurs only around the sterile exterior mycelium mass. The chaga fungus will continue to cause decay within the living tree for 10–80+ years. While the tree is alive, only sterile mycelial masses are produced (the black exterior conk). The sexual stage begins after the tree, or some portion of the tree, is killed by the infection. I. obliquus will begin to produce fertile fruiting bodies underneath the bark. These bodies begin as a whitish mass that turn to brown with time. Since the sexual stage occurs almost entirely under the bark, the fruiting body is rarely seen. These fruiting bodies produce basidiospores which will spread the infection to other vulnerable trees.

Distribution and cultivation
Generally found growing on birch (Betula spp.) trees, it has also been found on alder (Alnus spp.), beech (Fagus spp.) and poplar (Populus spp.). In species other than birch, the fungus often appears as buried stem canker, instead of the charcoal-like mass found on birch trees.

Attempts at cultivating this fungus on potato dextrose agar and other simulated mediums resulted in a reduced and markedly different production of metabolites. Cultivated chaga developed a reduced number of phytosterols, particularly lanosterol, an intermediate in the synthesis of ergosterol and lanostane-type triterpenes.

Chemistry
The black sclerotium has large concentrations of melanin. Chaga contains extremely high concentrations of oxalate, 2800–11200 mg total oxalates/100 g sclerotium, one of the highest reported in any organism.

Preparation
Chaga is traditionally grated into a fine powder and used to brew a beverage resembling coffee or tea and tastes strongly of Chinese herbal tea. However, caution is warranted with chronic use due to the extremely high concentrations of oxalates in chaga. Three extraction processes may be used.
 Hot water extraction is certainly the most common preparation. A decoction is created by simmering blocklike pieces of the chaga in numerous quarts of water until the water is reduced and the remaining liquid contains a portion of the chaga's concentrated water-soluble compounds. Such preparations, produced in China and Japan, are exported worldwide. The ß-D-glucans may have a content of approximately 35% in a pure extract. If chaga tea is prepared at home, the chaga chunks can be reused multiple times.
 Ethanol or methanol extraction isolates the water-insoluble components, betulinic acid, betulin and the phytosterols. This extraction process is in general used as a second step after hot-water extraction, since ethanol alone will not break down chitin effectively—heat is essential. 
 Fermentation is the most time-consuming and most expensive. Because fermentation methods are not standardized (many types of bacteria and fungi can be used in the process), the outcome is also not standardized.

See also
 Herbalism
 Medicinal fungi
 Polypores

References

Fungi described in 1801
Fungi of Asia
Fungi of Europe
Fungi of North America
obliquus
Medicinal fungi